Anna Köhler may refer to:

 Anna Kohler, German-American theater actress, director and translator
 Anna Köhler (bobsledder) (born 1993), German bobsledder
Anna Köhler (scientist), German physicist